Chicago shooting or Chicago massacre may refer to:
 Haymarket affair
 Chicago race riot of 1919, a racial conflict between White-Americans and African-Americans, that killed 38 people (23 of whom were Black and 15 were White)
 Saint Valentine's Day Massacre, a gang shooting in February 1929 that killed 7 people at Lincoln Park
 1937 Memorial Day massacre
 Richard Speck (1941–1991), American mass murderer who killed 8 student nurses either by stabbing, strangling, slashing, or a combination of the three between in July 1966
 Assassination of Fred Hampton, an African-American man who was killed on December 4, 1969
 Chicago Tylenol murders, a mass poisoning that killed 7 people between September to October 1982
 1999 Independence Day weekend shootings, a spree shooting in July 1999 that killed 2 people and injured 10 others that targeted Jews, Asian-Americans and African-Americans
 Killing of Rekia Boyd, an African-American woman who was fatally shot by police in March 2012
 Murder of Laquan McDonald, an African-American man who was fatally shot by police in October 2014
 Gage Park murders, a mass stabbing that killed 6 people of the Martinez family (5 of whom were stabbed and one was shot by gunfire) at Gage Park in February 2016
 Killing of Paul O'Neal, an African-American man who was fatally shot by police during a grand theft auto chase in July 2016
 Mercy Hospital shooting, a shooting at a hospital that killed 3 people in November 2018
 Killing of Adam Toledo, a Latino boy who was fatally shot by police in March 2021
 Killing of Anthony Alvarez, a Latino man who was fatally shot by police which occurred 2 days after the killing of Adam Toledo
 Killing of Zheng Shaoxiong, a Chinese immigrant who was fatally shot in November 2021  
 Magnificent Mile shooting, a mass shooting that killed 2 people and injured 8 others near a McDonald's in May 2022

See also 
 Crime in Chicago
 List of mass shootings in the United States